Leendert van Beijeren (1619–1649) was a Dutch Golden Age painter from the Northern Netherlands.

Beijeren was born in Amsterdam where he became a pupil of Rembrandt.

He died in Amsterdam.

References

1619 births
1649 deaths
Painters from Amsterdam
Dutch Golden Age painters
Dutch male painters
Pupils of Rembrandt